This is a list of all tornadoes that were confirmed by local offices of the National Weather Service in the United States from January to March 2015.

United States yearly total

January

January 3 event

January 4 event

January 18 event

January 24 event

February

February 5 event

February 23 event

March

March 24 event

March 25 event

See also
 Tornadoes of 2015
 List of United States tornadoes in April 2015

Notes

References

Tornadoes of 2015
2015, 01
January 2015 events in the United States
February 2015 events in the United States
March 2015 events in the United States